You Talk That Talk! is an album by saxophonists Gene Ammons and Sonny Stitt recorded in 1971 and released on the Prestige label.

Reception
The Allmusic review stated "You Talk That Talk lacks the can-you-top-this cutting contest duels that the tenor saxophonists could occasionally engage in on-stage. Instead, a relaxed, swinging vibe prevails, as Stitt and Ammons trade choruses over a loose, funky backdrop".

Track listing 
 "You Talk That Talk!" (Leon Spencer) – 5:55 
 "Body and Soul" (Frank Eyton, Johnny Green, Edward Heyman, Robert Sour) – 4:12
 "The People's Choice" (Harold Ousley) – 6:55  
 "Katea" (Sonny Stitt) – 6:40 
 "The Sun Died" (Ray Charles, Hubert Giraud, Pierre Leroyer, André Gregory) – 4:40
 "Out of It" (Harold Vick) – 5:00

Personnel 
Gene Ammons – tenor saxophone (note: "The Sun Died" is a feature for Ammons only)
Sonny Stitt – tenor saxophone, varitone (note: "Body and Soul" is a feature for Stitt only)
Leon Spencer – organ
George Freeman – guitar
Idris Muhammad – drums

References 

1971 albums
Prestige Records albums
Gene Ammons albums
Sonny Stitt albums
Albums produced by Bob Porter (record producer)
Albums recorded at Van Gelder Studio
Collaborative albums